The 2013 Open GDF Suez de Biarritz was a professional tennis tournament played on outdoor clay courts. It was the eleventh edition of the tournament which was part of the 2013 ITF Women's Circuit, offering a total of $100,000 in prize money. It took place in Biarritz, France, on 8–14 July 2013. The singles championship was won by Stephanie Vogt and the doubles championship was won by Yuliya Beygelzimer and Olga Savchuk.

WTA entrants

Seeds 

 1 Rankings as of 24 June 2013

Other entrants 
The following players received wildcards into the singles main draw:
  Estelle Cascino
  Irina Ramialison
  Constance Sibille
  Laura Thorpe

The following players received entry from the qualifying draw:
  Michaela Boev
  Varvara Flink
  Vanesa Furlanetto
  Sofiya Kovalets

Champions

Women's singles 

  Stephanie Vogt def.  Anna Karolína Schmiedlová 1–6, 6–3, 6–2

Women's doubles 

  Yuliya Beygelzimer /  Olga Savchuk def.  Vera Dushevina /  Ana Vrljić 2–6, 6–4, [10–8]

External links 
 Official website 
 2013 Open GDF Suez de Biarritz at ITFtennis.com

Notes

2013 ITF Women's Circuit
Open de Biarritz
2013 in French tennis